The Eta is a German-Italian Open Class two-seater flapped self-launching glider manufactured by ETA Aircraft. On introduction it was the highest performing glider.

Early flights
The second flight was the first aerotow launch, reaching . The third flight was self powered and had no problems. The official presentation was on 1 August.

Production

Three Etas have been manufactured. The second prototype was extensively damaged in 2003 during the spin tests required for the type certification but both pilots parachuted to safety. The prototype was repaired and the tests completed successfully. The glider was to be produced by hand at a rate of about three per year.

Development
The Eta is an example of a trend in glider development in which private pilots initiate the development of new open class gliders.

Operational history
An Eta participated in a World Championship for the first time in 2003 at Leszno. Its pilot, Janusz Centka, achieved an overall second place. Good placings have also been achieved by the Eta in later competitions. The glider is however hampered by the Open Class weight limitation which limits its wing loading in gusty weather to the advantage of its opponents.

Specifications

See also

Schleicher ASW 22
Binder EB29

References

External links
 Official site of the Eta Glider project.

2000s German sailplanes
T-tail aircraft
Aircraft first flown in 2000